Matthew Glaetzer (born 24 August 1992) is an Australian track cyclist.

Career

He competed in the team sprint event at the 2012 Summer Olympics, and won the 2012 World Championship in the team sprint with Scott Sunderland and Shane Perkins.

Glaetzer represented Australia in the men's sprint, men's keirin, and men's team sprint events at the 2016 Summer Olympics in Rio de Janeiro, Brazil.

On 12 November 2017, at the World Cup competition in Manchester, Glaetzer became the first rider ever to break the 1:00-minute mark for 1 km time trial, at sea level velodrome.

At the 2018 Commonwealth Games, Glaetzer won gold in the men's keirin. He was eliminated from the men's sprint in the quarterfinals. The next day, he won gold in the men's 1 km time trial.

At the Tokyo 2020 Olympics, Glaetzer courted controversy during the Keirin finals when he allowed a huge gap between Jason Kenny from Great Britain and the rest of the field.

At the 2022 Commonwealth Games, Glaetzer won gold in the men's team sprint alongside Leigh Hoffman and Matthew Richardson on the first day of the games. He also competed in the men's individual sprint event where he came 4th.

Competition record

Personal life
Glaetzer is a Christian. He stated that he has been a Christian all his life, but drifted from God during his teens due to injuries. He rededicated his life to God at a camp run by his local church. He also said God gave him the gift of cycling. Glaetzer leads a youth group at Influencers Church in Paradise, Adelaide.

Glaetzer is a student at University of South Australia, where he is studying a degree in Human Movement. He has stated that he wants to go into physiotherapy when he retires from cycling.

In October 2019, Glaetzer was diagnosed with thyroid cancer.

References

External links

London 2012 profile
Australian Olympic team profile

1992 births
Australian Christians
Australian male cyclists
Australian track cyclists
Commonwealth Games bronze medallists for Australia
Commonwealth Games gold medallists for Australia
Cyclists at the 2012 Summer Olympics
Cyclists at the 2014 Commonwealth Games
Cyclists at the 2016 Summer Olympics
Cyclists at the 2018 Commonwealth Games
Cyclists at the 2020 Summer Olympics
Living people
Olympic cyclists of Australia
Cyclists from Adelaide
UCI Track Cycling World Champions (men)
Commonwealth Games medallists in cycling
Cyclists at the 2022 Commonwealth Games
21st-century Australian people
Medallists at the 2014 Commonwealth Games
Medallists at the 2018 Commonwealth Games
Medallists at the 2022 Commonwealth Games